Philip Grosser (1890 in Slavuta – October 3, 1933 in Boston) was an anarchist and anti-militarist, hailed by fellow anarchist, Alexander Berkman, as "one of [my] finest comrades".

He was imprisoned at the Federal Military Prison on Alcatraz Island, having refused the draft during the first World War. By the end of 1920, two years after the war ended, he was the only remaining conscientious objector at Alcatraz, and in poor health.

Grosser is notable for writing one of the first exposés of Alcatraz Prison, the 32-page pamphlet Uncle Sam's Devil's Island, which told of his experience in the prison.

He committed suicide in Boston, Massachusetts in October 1933 and was buried on October 20, 1933.

Work

References

Further reading 

 
 
 
 

American anarchists
American conscientious objectors
People from Boston
Suicides in Massachusetts
1890 births
1933 suicides
Inmates of U.S. Military Prison, Alcatraz Island